Middleton Scriven is a village and civil parish  south east of Shrewsbury, in the Shropshire district, in the county of Shropshire, England. In 2011 the parish had a population of 143. In 2011 Nomis recorded a population of 146. The parish touches Stottesdon, Sidbury, Deuxhill and Chetton.

Features 
There are 3 listed buildings in Middleton Scriven. Middleton Scriven has a church called St John the Baptist's Church.

History 
The name "Middleton" means 'Middle farm/settlement'. Middleton was recorded in the Domesday Book as Scriven Middeltone. Middleton Scriven was formerly just Middleton.

References 

Villages in Shropshire
Civil parishes in Shropshire